Joáo Francisco de Sales or simply Sales (born June 9, 1986 in São Paulo) is a Brazilian striker, who plays for CA Linense.

Club statistics

References

External links

1986 births
Living people
Brazilian footballers
Brazilian expatriate footballers
Expatriate footballers in Japan
Expatriate footballers in Bulgaria
Expatriate footballers in the Czech Republic
J2 League players
Czech First League players
First Professional Football League (Bulgaria) players
Associação Desportiva São Caetano players
FC Slovan Liberec players
Ventforet Kofu players
Vegalta Sendai players
Yokohama FC players
Clube Atlético Bragantino players
Associação Desportiva Recreativa e Cultural Icasa players
PFC Beroe Stara Zagora players
Mogi Mirim Esporte Clube players
Clube Atlético Linense players
Vila Nova Futebol Clube players
Association football forwards